Xestia maculata is an owlet moth species found in North America, where it has been recorded from western Canada and Montana. It inhabits open alpine tundra.

References

Moths described in 1893
Xestia
Moths of North America